Abdoulaye Paye Camara (born 20 December 1995) is a Guinean professional footballer who plays as a midfielder for Guinée Championnat National club Horoya AC.

Club career
Born in Conakry, Camara has played club football for Séquence de Dixinn, Horoya AC, and Paris 13 Atletico.

International career 
Camara made his international debut for Guinea in 2013.

Honours 
Horoya AC

 Guinée Championnat National: 2015–16, 2016–17, 2017–18, 2018–19

References

1995 births
Living people
Guinean footballers
Guinea international footballers
FC Séquence de Dixinn players
Horoya AC players
Paris 13 Atletico players
Association football defenders
Guinée Championnat National players
Championnat National 2 players
Guinean expatriate sportspeople in France
Expatriate footballers in France
Guinean expatriate footballers